Trachylepis nganghae is a species of skink found in Cameroon.

References

Endemic fauna of Cameroon
Trachylepis
Reptiles described in 2004
Taxa named by Laurent Chirio
Taxa named by Ivan Ineich